Dailly railway station served the village of Dailly, South Ayrshire, Scotland, from 1860 to 1965 on the Maybole and Girvan Railway.

History 
The station was opened on 24 May 1860 by the Glasgow and South Western Railway. On the southbound platform was the station building, to the east was the goods yard and on the north side of the southbound platform was the signal box, which was replaced in 1894. The station closed on 6 September 1965 and the signal box closed later in the same year.

References

External links
RAILSCOT - Dailly

Disused railway stations in South Ayrshire
Railway stations in Great Britain opened in 1860
Railway stations in Great Britain closed in 1965
Beeching closures in Scotland
Former Glasgow and South Western Railway stations